Jeremy Mercer (born 1971) is an author and journalist whose books include Time Was Soft There (St. Martin's Press, New York, 2005) and When the Guillotine Fell (St. Martin's Press, New York, 2008). He has also translated Robert Badinter's Abolition into English for University Press of New England. He is a founding member of the Paris arts collective Kilometer Zero. He is also the author of Money for Nothing (October 1999) and The Champagne Gang: High Times and Sweet Crimes (January 1998).

Mercer had a cameo appearance in the 2014 film Avis de Mistral with Jean Reno.

External links 
 Jeremy Mercer's official site
 Jeremy Mercer's favorite bookstores (The Guardian) 
 

1971 births
Living people
Writers from Ottawa
Journalists from Ontario
Canadian translators
Canadian autobiographers